San Maung Maung  also San Mg Mg (born 24 May 1958) is a Burmese politician who serves as an Amyotha Hluttaw MP for Bago Region No.1 Constituency. He is a member of the National League for Democracy.

Early life and education
San Maung Maung  was born on 24 May 1978 in Nyaunglebin Township, Bago Region, Myanmar . He graduated M.B.B.S from University of Medicine 1, Yangon. He previously worked as a Medical Doctor.

Political career
He is a member of the National League for Democracy. In the 2015 Myanmar general election, he was elected as an Amyotha Hluttaw MP and elected representative from Bago Region No. 1 parliamentary constituency. He also serves as a  Secretary of Amyotha Hluttaw Health, Sports and Culture Committee.

References

National League for Democracy politicians
1958 births
Living people
People from Bago Region